Ziegelheim is a village and a former municipality in the district Altenburger Land, in Thuringia, Germany. Since July 2018, it is part of the municipality Nobitz.

History
Within the German Empire (1871–1918), Ziegelheim was part of the Kingdom of Saxony.

References

Altenburger Land
Former municipalities in Thuringia